São Tomé and Príncipe – United States relations are bilateral relations between São Tomé and Príncipe and the United States. The U.S. Ambassador based at the embassy in Libreville, Gabon was accredited to Sao Tome on a non-resident basis until 2022, when that role was designated to the U.S. Ambassador based at the embassy in Luanda, Angola. The Ambassador and Embassy staff make regular visits to the islands. The US State Department has described relations with São Tomé and Príncipe as excellent.

History of the relationship
São Tomé and Príncipe began developing foreign relations following her independence in 1975. The United States was among the first countries to accredit an ambassador to São Tomé and Príncipe. The first Sao Tomean Ambassador to the United States, resident in New York City, was accredited in 1985. In 1986, Sao Tomean President Manuel Pinto da Costa visited the United States and met with then-Vice President George H. W. Bush. The U.S. government also maintains a number of smaller assistance programs in Sao Tome, administered through non-governmental organizations or the Embassy in Luanda.

In 1992, the US federal government broadcaster Voice of America and the government of São Tomé signed a long-term agreement for the establishment of a relay transmitter station in Sao Tome. Voice of America currently broadcasts to much of Africa from this facility.

In 2001, President Fradique de Menezes accepted $100,000 from Environmental Remediation, an American oil company involved in offshore exploration, but stated that the money was a legitimate campaign contribution.

In August 2002 the BBC reported that São Tomé and Príncipe had agreed to host a US naval base to protect its oil interests.
The islands are in a strategic position in the Gulf of Guinea from which the US could monitor the movement of oil tankers and guard oil platforms. Later in 2002, General Carlton W. Fulford, Jr., deputy commander in chief of the United States European Command, visited Sao Tome for planning talks on security.

On July 16, 2003 the government of the 140,000 person state was briefly deposed in an attempted military coup. The US State Department deplored the takeover and urged those involved to release the arrested government officials. The coup leaders handed back power a few days later when the president promised to restore democratic rule.

In July 2005, a U.S. Coast Guard cutter with a crew of 100 visited São Tomé and Príncipe in a public relations exercise. Carlos Neves, vice-president of the national assembly stated: "Unfortunately, Americans are interested in Sao Tome because of oil, but Sao Tome existed before that."

In November 2007 the United States and São Tomé and Príncipe signed a Millennium Challenge Corporation Threshold Program agreement worth US$8.66 million, designed to help the country improve its fiscal policy indicators by streamlining business registration processes, tax and customs administration.

US ambassadors

The current US non-resident ambassador to São Tomé and Príncipe is Tulinabo S. Mushingi.

See also 
 Foreign relations of São Tomé and Príncipe
 Foreign relations of the United States

Notes and references

External links
History of Sao Tome and Principe - U.S. relations

 
Bilateral relations of the United States
United States